In enzymology, a strombine dehydrogenase is an enzyme that catalyzes the chemical reaction

N-(carboxymethyl)-D-alanine + NAD+ + H2O  glycine + pyruvate + NADH + H+

The 3 substrates of this enzyme are N-(carboxymethyl)-D-alanine, NAD+, and H2O, whereas its 4 products are glycine, pyruvate, NADH, and H+.

This enzyme belongs to the family of oxidoreductases, specifically those acting on the CH-NH group of donor with NAD+ or NADP+ as acceptor.  The systematic name of this enzyme class is N-(carboxymethyl)-D-alanine:NAD+ oxidoreductase (glycine-forming). Other names in common use include strombine[N-(carboxymethyl)-D-alanine]dehydrogenase, and N-(carboxymethyl)-D-alanine: NAD+ oxidoreductase.

References

 

EC 1.5.1
NADH-dependent enzymes
Enzymes of unknown structure